Miguel Ramon Medina (born 1 June 1993) is a Paraguayan football player. His main position is centre forward but he can also play at left and right wing.

Career
He began his career at Club Rubio Ñu. In May 2010 it was reported, that Medina had gone to Italy to negotiate with Udinese. He passed the medical test's but because he was only 16 years old at the time, he had to wait until he was 18. He joined Udinese on in September 2011. In his first season, Medina played three games for the Primavera squad and 18 games in the following season, scoring 8 goals.

In January 2013, he was loaned out to Napoli. In the 2013–14 season, Medina was loaned out to Perugia. Medina left Italy and joined General Díaz for the 2015 season.

References

External links
Profile at BDFA

Paraguayan footballers
Paraguayan expatriates in Italy
1993 births
Living people
People from San Lorenzo, Paraguay
Association football forwards
Sport Colombia footballers
Independiente F.B.C. footballers
General Díaz footballers